DC Challenge was a 12-issue comic book limited series produced by DC Comics from November 1985 to October 1986, as a round robin experiment in narrative. The series' tagline was "Can You Solve It Before We Do?"

Publication history
The DC Challenge series was conceived during a rooftop party at the 1983 San Diego Comic-Con. The premise of the series was that each chapter would be written by a different author and illustrated by a different artist. No consultation between authors was permitted. As well, each chapter would end in a seemingly impossible cliffhanger from which that chapter's author had to have planned a viable escape, and the name of the next chapter would be provided. Authors were free to use any character or concept from DC's then-50 years of publication, with the exception of those whose appearances they were currently writing. Dick Giordano had been the original editor of the series, but turned the job over to Robert Greenberger before the first issue was published. The last issue of DC Challenge was a collaborative effort by six of the twelve writers.

The issues

See also 
 The Kamandi Challenge

References

External links
 
 DC Challenge at Mike's Amazing World of Comics

1985 comics debuts
1986 comics endings
Collaborative fiction
Comics by Dan Jurgens
Comics by Dave Gibbons
Comics by Doug Moench
Comics by Gerry Conway
Comics by Keith Giffen
Comics by Len Wein
Comics by Marv Wolfman
Comics by Paul Kupperberg
Comics by Paul Levitz
Comics by Roy Thomas
DC Comics limited series
Defunct American comics